Ghost Game may refer to:

Ghost Game (film), a 2004 American film
La-Tha-Pii or Ghost Game, a 2006 Thai film
Ghost Game (novel), a 2011 novel by Nigel Hinton
Digimon Ghost Game, an 2021 anime series.
EA Gothenburg, a video game developer formerly known as Ghost Games